Amadei is an Italian surname. Notable people with the surname include:

Amedeo Amadei (1921-2013), Italian footballer
Bernard Amadei (born 1954), French-born engineer
Emilio Amadei (born 1867), Italian painter
Filippo Amadei, also known as Pippo del Violoncello, Italian composer
Leonetto Amadei (1911-1997), Italian lawyer and a politician
Magali Amadei (born 1974), French fashion model
Roberto Amadei (1933-2009), bishop of Bergamo
Stefano Amadei (1580-1644), Italian painter

Italian-language surnames